The sandpaper figs are so named for their leaves, which are rough and sandpaper-like in texture. The common name may refer to a number of species in the genus Ficus:

Australian species:
Ficus carpentariensis, possibly hybrid individuals
Ficus coronata, creek sandpaper fig
Ficus coronulata, crown, peach-leaf or river fig
Ficus copiosa, sandpaper fig of New Guinea and northern Australia
Ficus fraseri, white or shiny sandpaper fig
Ficus leptoclada, Atherton sandpaper fig
Ficus opposita, sweet sandpaper fig
Ficus podocarpifolia 
Ficus scobina, sandpaper fig
Ficus virgata

Others:
Ficus capreifolia, river sandpaper fig
Ficus exasperata, sandpaper forest fig

 
Rosales of Australia